Carbondale Township is one of sixteen townships in Jackson County, Illinois, USA.  As of the 2010 census, its population was 29,544 and it contained 14,341 housing units.  Southern Illinois University is located in this township.

Geography

Cities, towns, villages
 Carbondale (vast majority)

Unincorporated towns
 Evergreen Terrace at 
 Southern Hills at 
(This list is based on USGS data and may include former settlements.)

Adjacent townships
 De Soto Township (north)
 Makanda Township (south)
 Pomona Township (southwest)
 Murphysboro Township (west)
 Somerset Township (northwest)

Cemeteries
The township contains these six cemeteries: Dillinger, North County Line, Oakland, Snider Hill, Winchester and Woodlawn.

Major highways
  U.S. Route 51
  Illinois Route 13

Airports and landing strips
 Memorial Hospital of Carbondale Heliport
 Southern Illinois Airport (southeast quarter)

Lakes
 Campus Lake

Landmarks
 Attucks Park
 Evergreen Park
 The Crossings
 University Mall

Demographics

School districts
 Murphysboro Community Unit School District 186

Political districts
 Illinois' 12th congressional district
 State House District 115
 State Senate District 58

References
 
 United States Census Bureau 2007 TIGER/Line Shapefiles
 United States National Atlas

External links
 City-Data.com
 Illinois State Archives

Townships in Jackson County, Illinois
Townships in Illinois